Bioluminescence is the production of light by living organisms. This list of bioluminescent organisms is organized by the environment, covering terrestrial, marine, and microorganisms.

Terrestrial animals
certain arthropods
fireflies
click beetle specific types (e.g. Pyrophorini, Balgus, Campyloxenus, etc.)
glow worms
railroad worms
certain mycetophilid flies
certain centipedes such as Geophilus carpophagus
certain millipedes such as Motyxia
a terrestrial mollusc (a tropical land snail)
Quantula striata
annelids

Marine animals

Fish

Anglerfish 
Gulper eel
Lanternfish
Marine hatchetfish
Midshipman fish
Pineconefish
Viperfish
Black dragonfish

Invertebrates

Many cnidarians
Sea pens
 Renilla reniformis
coral
Aequorea victoria, a jellyfish
Certain Ctenophores or "comb jellies"
Certain echinoderms (e.g. Ophiurida)
 Amphiura filiformis
 Ophiopsila aranea
 Ophiopsila californica
 Amphipholis squamata
Certain crustaceans
Ostracods
Copepods
Krill
Two species of chaetognaths
 Annelids (Annelida)
 Tomopteris helgolandica
Certain molluscs
Certain clams, bivalves
Certain nudibranchs, sea slugs
few sea snails, such as Hinea brasiliana
Certain cephalopods
Certain Octopuses
Bolitaenidae
Vampire squid
Sepiolida
Many Teuthida (squid)
Colossal Squid
Mastigoteuthidae
Firefly squid

Freshwater animals
Latia, a genus of four species of freshwater snail

Fungi

Bacteria
 Photorhabdus luminescens
Certain species of the family Vibrionaceae (e.g. Vibrio fischeri, Vibrio harveyi, Photobacterium phosphoreum)
Certain species of the family Shewanellaceae, (e.g. Shewanella hanedai and Shewanella woodyi)

Other microorganisms
Protists
Certain Dinoflagellates (e.g. Noctiluca scintillans, Pyrodinium bahamense, Pyrocystis fusiformis  and Lingulodinium polyedrum

References 

Bioluminescent
 List of